Andina is a solo album by Argentine bandoneón player and composer Dino Saluzzi recorded in 1988 and released on the ECM label.

Reception
The Allmusic review awarded the album 3 stars.

Track listing
All compositions by Dino Saluzzi
 "Dance (In the Morning)" - 8:11 
 "Winter" - 5:57 
 "Transmutation (Romanza and Toccata)" - 5:11 
 "Remoteness... And the Years Went By" - 2:55 
 "Tango of Obligation: Introduction/Dance/The End" - 5:03 
 "Choral (The Man of the Mirsacles)" - 4:16 
 "Waltz for Verna" - 2:46 
 "Andina: Toccata (My Father)/Huaino (...My Small Town)/The End (...And the Days Arrived)" - 7:29 
 "Memories" - 1:22 
Recorded at Rainbow Studio in Oslo, Norway in May 1988

Personnel
Dino Saluzzi — bandoneón, flute

References

ECM Records albums
Dino Saluzzi albums
1988 albums
Albums produced by Manfred Eicher